Preben is a given name. Notable people with the name include:

Preben von Ahnen (1606–1675), German-born civil servant and landowner in Norway
Preben Arentoft (born 1942), Danish former football player
Preben Fjære Brynemo (born 1977), Norwegian Nordic combined skier
Preben Christiansen (1913–1979), Danish fencer
Preben Eriksen (born 1958), former speedway rider
Preben Fabricius (1931–1984), Danish furniture designer, worked with Jørgen Kastholm
Preben Møller Hansen (1929–2008), Danish writer, cook, politician, and trade unionist
Preben Harris (born 1935), Danish film and stage actor
Preben Van Hecke (born 1982), Belgian professional road bicycle racer
Preben Hertoft (born 1928), Danish psychiatrist, professor in medical sexology, senior doctorate in medicine
Preben Isaksson (1943–2008), Danish cyclist
Preben Jensen (born 1944), Danish sprint canoeist
Preben Kaas (1930–1981), Danish comedian, actor, script writer and film director
Preben Krab (born 1952), Danish rower who competed in the 1968 Summer Olympics
Preben Kristensen (born 1953), Danish actor
Preben Lundgren Kristensen (1923–1986), Danish cyclist
Preben Elkjær (born 1957), retired Danish professional footballer
Preben Lundbye (born 1950), Danish football coach
Preben Maegaard (born 1935), Danish renewable energy pioneer, author and expert
Preben Mahrt (1920–1989), Danish film actor
Preben De Man (born 1996), Belgian professional footballer
Preben Munthe (1922–2013), Norwegian economist
Preben Neergaard (1920–1990), Danish stage and film actor
Preben Philipsen (1910–2005), Danish film producer
Eilert Waldemar Preben Ramm (1769–1837), Norwegian military officer and politician
Preben Lerdorff Rye (1917–1995), Danish film actor
Axel Schmidt-Preben (born 1939), Brazilian sailor
Erik Schmidt-Preben (born 1939), Brazilian sailor
Preben Uglebjerg (1931–1968), Danish film actor
Preben Vildalen (born 1972), Norwegian handball player

Danish masculine given names